Kivu Air is an airline based in Goma, Democratic Republic of the Congo. It operates charter and cargo services in the area. Its main bases are Goma International Airport and Bukavu Airport.

The airline is on the List of air carriers banned in the European Union.

History 
The airline was established and started operations in 1997. It has 27 employees (at March 2007).

Fleet 
As of March 2008 the Kivu Air fleet includes:
1 Casa C.212-200 Aviocar

References

Defunct airlines of the Democratic Republic of the Congo
Airlines established in 1997